KMAV-FM (105.5 FM) is a radio station in Mayville, North Dakota, serving the Red River Valley of eastern North Dakota and northwest Minnesota with a country music format on weekdays and oldies format on weekends. KMAV is known as "Your Sports Leader in the Red River Valley" in reference of their coverage of local high school sport events.

Programming
Notable programming includes hourly updates from CBS News and periodic updates from the Dakota News Network and Red River Farm Network. During the school year, the station features "Comet Radio" which consists of different shows from students and staff from Mayville's local college, Mayville State University.  It airs on Wednesdays during the school year 4:00-6:00pm.

While known for local sports coverage, KMAV-FM also airs The Dan Patrick Show, country music and oldies. Originally on 101.7, KMAV-FM moved to 105.5 in the mid-1980s to make room for an upgrade to KFGO-FM 101.9 in Fargo. KMAV-FM simulcasted with KMSR (formerly KMAV-AM) until November 2003.

Family matters
KMSR is family owned. Five-time North Dakota Sportscaster of the Year, Dan Keating, calls basketball, baseball, football, volleyball, and wrestling. His wife, Mary, is the company's president.  Their sons, Craig and Mike, are also active in the company.

Sports
KMAV carries over three hundred local game broadcasts per year.  In addition to local sports, KMAV airs hundreds of NFL, college football, and college basketball games from Westwood One and Sports USA Radio networks.

External links
KMAV website
Fargo Forum article

MAV
Country radio stations in the United States
Mayville, North Dakota